Oshuku Dam  is a gravity dam located in Iwate Prefecture in Japan. The dam is used for flood control and irrigation. The catchment area of the dam is 14.8 km2. The dam impounds about 23  ha of land when full and can store 1793 thousand cubic meters of water. The construction of the dam was completed in 1957.

See also
List of dams in Japan

References

Dams in Iwate Prefecture